The East Manchester Academy is a coeducational secondary school located in the Beswick area of Manchester, England.

It was established as an academy in September 2010, and was originally sponsored by Laing O'Rourke, Lend Lease, Manchester City Council and The Manchester College. The school also had specialisms in The Built Environment and Performing Arts.

However, due to poor performance the school became part of the Education and Leadership Trust in September 2016.

Today, The East Manchester Academy offers GCSEs, BTECs and vocational qualifications as programmes of study for its pupils.

References

External links
The East Manchester Academy official website

Secondary schools in Manchester
Academies in Manchester
Educational institutions established in 2010
2010 establishments in England